Palestinian Jews or Jewish Palestinians were the Jewish inhabitants of the Palestine region (known in Hebrew as Eretz Yisrael) prior to the establishment of the State of Israel in 1948.

The common term used to refer to the Jewish communities of Ottoman Syria during the 19th century and British Palestine prior to the 1948 establishment of the State of Israel is Yishuv. A distinction is drawn between the "New Yishuv", which was largely composed of and descended from Jewish immigrants who arrived in the Levant during the First Aliyah (1881–1903), and the "Old Yishuv", which was the pre-existing Jewish community of Palestine prior to the consolidation of Zionism and the First Aliyah.

In addition to applying to Jews who lived in Palestine during the British Mandate era, the term "Palestinian Jews" has been applied to the Jewish residents of Southern Syria, corresponding to the southern part of the Syria region under the Ottoman Empire; there are also historical scholarly instances in which Jews residing in the Palaestina Prima and Palaestina Secunda provinces (4th to 7th centuries CE) of the Byzantine Empire in Late Antiquity were referred to as "Palestinian Jews".

After the establishment of the State of Israel in 1948, the Jews of Mandatory Palestine became Israeli citizens, and the term "Palestinian Jews" has largely fallen into disuse and is somewhat defunct, in favour of the modern term Israeli Jews.

Historical overview

Prior to dismemberment of the Ottoman Empire, the population of the area comprising modern Israel, the West Bank, and Gaza Strip was not exclusively Muslim.  Under the Empire's rule in the mid-16th century, there were no more than 10,000 Jews in Palestine, making up around 5% of the population. By the mid-19th century, Turkish sources recorded that 80% of the population of 600,000 was identified as Muslim, 10% as Christian Arab and 5–7% as Jewish.

The situation of the Jewish community in Palestine was more complicated than in neighbouring Arab countries. Whereas in Yemen, Iraq, Syria and Lebanon, communities were largely homogeneous in ethnic and confessional terms, in Palestine in the 19th century, Jewish pilgrims and European Christian colonial projects attracted large numbers of Ashkenazi immigrants from Eastern Europe and Sephardic groups from Bulgaria, Turkey and North Africa. The Jews of Palestine were not exclusively of Iberian origins, and included substantial Yiddish speaking communities who had established themselves in Palestine centuries earlier.  

Towards the end of the Ottoman era in Palestine, native Jewish communities lived primarily in the four 'holy cities' of Safed, Tiberias, Hebron and Jerusalem. The Jewish population consisted of Ashkenazim (Yiddish speakers), Sephardim (Judeo-Spanish speakers), and Maghrebim (North African Arabic speakers) or Mizrahim (Middle Eastern Jews, comparable to the Arabic term "Mashriqiyyun", or Easterners). The majority of Jews in the four holy cities, with the exception of Jerusalem, were Arabic and Judaeo-Spanish speakers. The dominant language among Jews in Jerusalem was Yiddish, due to the large migration of pious Ashkenazi Jews from Russia and Eastern Europe. Still, in 1882, there were registered 7,620 Sephardim/Mizrahim/Maghrebim, in Jerusalem, of whom 1,290 were Maghrebim, from the Maghreb or North Africa. Natives of the city, they were Turkish subjects, and fluent in Arabic. Arabic also served as the lingua franca between the Sephradim/Mizrahim/Maghrebim and Ashkenazim and their non-Jewish Arab counterparts in mixed cities like Safed and Hebron. However, during the Greek and Roman period, the primary language of Palestinian Jews was Aramaic, a Semitic language closely related to Hebrew.

In the narrative works of Arabs in Palestine in the late Ottoman period, as evidenced in the autobiographies and diaries of Khalil al-Sakakini and Wasif Jawhariyyeh, "native" Jews were often referred to and described as abnaa al-balad (sons of the country), 'compatriots', or Yahud awlad Arab (Jews, sons of Arabs). When the First Palestinian Congress of February 1919 issued its anti-Zionist manifesto rejecting Zionist immigration, it extended a welcome to those Jews "among us who have been Arabicized, who have been living in our province since before the war; they are as we are, and their loyalties are our own."

Reference to European Jews as "Palestinians" prior to 1948
European Jews were commonly considered an "Oriental" people in many of their host countries, usually as reference to their ancestral origins in the Middle East. A prominent example of this is Immanuel Kant, an 18th-century Prussian philosopher who referred to European Jews as "Palestinians living among us."

Naming of "Israel" in Arabic
Official documents released in April 2013 by the State Archive of Israel show that days before the establishment of the State of Israel in May 1948, Jewish officials were still debating about what the new country would be called in Arabic: Palestine, Zion or Israel.  Two assumptions were made: "That an Arab state was about to be established alongside the Jewish one in keeping with the UN’s partition resolution the year before, and that the Jewish state would include a large Arab minority whose feelings needed to be taken into account".  In the end, the officials rejected the name Palestine because they thought that would be the name of the new Arab state and could cause confusion so they opted for the most straightforward option: Israel.

Dispute over usage of the term "Palestinian Jew"

PLO usage
The Palestinian National Charter, as amended by the PLO's Palestinian National Council in July 1968, defined "Palestinians" as "those Arab nationals who, until 1947, normally resided in Palestine regardless of whether they were evicted from it or stayed there. Anyone born, after that date, of a Palestinian father—whether in Palestine or outside it—is also a Palestinian. The Jews who had normally resided in Palestine until the beginning of the Zionist invasion will be considered Palestinians."

Israeli usage
Yaakov Meir (born in 1856 in Jerusalem), the first Sephardic Chief Rabbi appointed in Mandatory Palestine, preferred not to use the term "Palestinian Jew" due to his Zionist affiliations. He spoke fluent Hebrew and encouraged the construction of new Jewish quarters of Jerusalem as well as the re-establishment of an Independent Israeli Jewish State.

Ben-Zion Meir Hai Uziel (Born in 1880 in Jerusalem), was the Sephardi chief rabbi of Mandatory Palestine from 1939 to 1948, and of Israel from 1948 to 1954. He served as a Mizrahi delegate to the Zionist Congress from 1925–46. As a religious Zionist, he strongly believed in the redemption of Israel and bringing the Jewish exiles back to the land to create a religious Jewish state of Israel. As a strong supporter of Israeli nationalism, in his writing The Redemption of Israel he wrote: "We all desire that the in gathering of the exiles should take place from all areas where they have been scattered; and that our holy language will be upon our lips and upon the lips of our children, in building the Land and its flowering through the hands and work of Israel; and we will all strive to see the flag of freedom and redemption waving in glory and strength upon the walls of Jerusalem."

Mordechai Eliyahu (Born in Jerusalem 3 March 1929 – 7 June 2010) was a prominent rabbi, posek and spiritual leader. He served as the Sephardi Chief Rabbi of Israel from 1983 to 1993. Because Eliyahu was one of the spiritual leaders of the Religious Zionist movement he refused to use the term "Palestinian" and believed all Jews should refrain from using the term. He was an outspoken opponent of the Gaza Disengagement of 2005 and supported Jewish settlements in Gaza and the West Bank. He was considered somewhat controversial for his decades-long support of the radical right of the Religious Zionist movement. Eliyahu was a friend of Rabbi Meir Kahane and his family.

Uri Davis, an Israeli citizen, academic, activist and observer-member in the Palestinian National Council living in the Arab town of Sakhnin, identified himself as an "anti-Zionist Palestinian Hebrew". Davis explained, "I don’t describe myself as a Palestinian Hebrew, but I actually happen to be a Palestinian Hebrew, I was born in Jerusalem in 1943 in a country called Palestine and the title of my birth certificate is 'Government of Palestine'. That is neither here nor there, though. It is significant only in a political context in which I am situated, and the political context that is relevant to my work, my advocacy of a critique of Zionism. I'm an anti-Zionist." He has since converted to Islam in 2008 to marry a Palestinian Muslim woman Miyassar Abu Ali whom he met in 2006. Since then he no longer considers himself Jewish.

Tali Fahima, an Israeli pro-Palestinian activist, describes her nationality as Palestinian. Fahima was born in Kiryat Gat, a development town in the south of Israel, to a family of Algerian Jewish origin. Fahima lives in the Arab village Ar'ara in northern Israel, and works as a Hebrew teacher. In June 2010, it was reported that she converted to Islam at a mosque in Umm al-Fahm.

Actor, director and activist Juliano Mer-Khamis, the son of an Israeli Jewish mother and a Palestinian father, described himself in a 2009 interview with Israel Army Radio as "100 percent Palestinian Arab and 100 percent Jewish".

See also
 Ancient synagogues in Palestine
 Arab Jews
 History of the Jews and Judaism in the Land of Israel
 Jewish Palestinian Aramaic
 Mashriqi Jews
 Mizrahi Jews
 Palestinian Gaonate
 Palestinian minhag
 Palestinian rabbis
 Palestinian Talmud
 Palestinian vocalization
 Sabra (person)
Samaritans

Further reading 

 David Muchlinski. 2021. "Swords and Plowshares: Property Rights, Collective Action, and Nonstate Governance in the Jewish Community of Palestine 1920–1948." American Political Science Review.

References

External links

 
Jews in Mandatory Palestine
Jews and Judaism in Palestine (region)